The Battle of Murcia or Battle of the Huerto de las Bombas was a battle on 4 September 1706, between the Bourbons under bishop Luis de Belluga and a combined British and Dutch force. It formed part of the War of the Spanish Succession and occurred near the Spanish town of Murcia. It resulted in a Bourbon victory.

References 

Garre Clemente, Juan Antonio. «La Batalla del Huerto de las Bombas». Región de Murcia Digital.
«Regiment d'Infanteria de Don Diego Rejón, Marqués de Alcantarilla» 11setembre1714.org.

Conflicts in 1706
Murcia
Murcia
1706 in Spain
Murcia
Murcia